Święte may refer to:

Święte, Lower Silesian Voivodeship (south-west Poland)
Święte, Aleksandrów County in Kuyavian-Pomeranian Voivodeship (north-central Poland)
Święte, Grudziądz County in Kuyavian-Pomeranian Voivodeship (north-central Poland)
Święte, Świecie County in Kuyavian-Pomeranian Voivodeship (north-central Poland)
Święte, Subcarpathian Voivodeship (south-east Poland)
Święte, Gniezno County in Greater Poland Voivodeship (west-central Poland)
Święte, Konin County in Greater Poland Voivodeship (west-central Poland)
Święte, Lubusz Voivodeship (west Poland)
Święte, Pomeranian Voivodeship (north Poland)
Święte, West Pomeranian Voivodeship (north-west Poland)

See also
Kolonia Święte
Święte Laski
Święte Miejsce, Masovian Voivodeship
Święte Nowaki